Gary Kenneth King (born September 29, 1954) is an American lawyer, politician, and energy consultant who served as the 30th attorney general of New Mexico from January 1, 2007, to January 1, 2015. King previously served as an advisor in the United States Department of Energy, a member of the New Mexico House of Representatives, and the Democratic nominee for New Mexico governor in the 2014 election.

Early life and education 
King is the son of Bruce King, a three-time Governor of New Mexico, and Alice M. King. He attended New Mexico State University and obtained a bachelor's degree in chemistry in 1976. He received his Ph.D. in organic chemistry from University of Colorado, Boulder in 1980. He then attended the University of New Mexico School of Law, where earned a Juris Doctor.

Career 
In 1984, King formed the law firm of King and Stanley in Moriarty, New Mexico; in 1990, he assumed the position of Corporate General Counsel and Senior Environmental Scientist with Advanced Sciences, Inc., an environmental consulting firm.

From 1986 to 1998, he served as a member of the New Mexico House of Representatives, where he represented the 50th district.

U.S. Department of Energy 
In 1998, he became the policy advisor to the Assistant Secretary for Environmental Management at the United States Department of Energy (DOE) in Washington, D.C. Within a year, he became the department's director of the Office of Worker and Community Transition. While at the DOE, he developed and implemented a program fostering cooperation between federal, state, local and Native American governments to enhance cleanup activities.

Attorney General 
As the 30th Attorney General of New Mexico, King spearheaded the effort to get legislation passed that made it a felony crime to engage in the practice of human trafficking. The United Nations committee invited King to present this legislation as a model for other nations seeking to end the practice of human slavery.

On March 2, 2011, King on behalf of the Respondent, New Mexico, argued before the United States Supreme Court in Bullcoming v. New Mexico. On July 10, 2012, King officially announced that he was seeking the Democratic nomination for Governor of New Mexico.

Elections

1998 gubernatorial election 

King was a candidate for Governor of New Mexico in the 1998 New Mexico gubernatorial election, placing second in the Democratic primary to then-Mayor of Albuquerque Martin Chavez.

2004 congressional election 

In 2004, King ran for New Mexico's 2nd congressional district seat, losing to incumbent Republican Steve Pearce. In 2006, King was elected Attorney General of New Mexico. He was re-elected in 2010, winning against Curry County District Attorney Matthew Chandler.

2014 gubernatorial election

On June 3, 2014, King won the New Mexico Democratic Primary for Governor and was immediately endorsed by his opponents; Alan Webber, Lawrence Rael, Howie Morales and Linda Lopez. King unsuccessfully ran against incumbent Republican Governor Susana Martinez in the general election. He told fellow Democrats at a fundraiser that Martinez "does not have a Latino heart".

Personal life 
In 1987, he married Yolanda Jones. Jones was the director of Engineering & Technical Management at the Air Force Nuclear Weapons Center (AFNWC) at Kirtland Air Force Base. She also served as chair for the NATO RTO Sensors and Electronics Technology Panel.

Gary King often accompanied his wife to meetings. They traveled to countries such as Taiwan, France, Italy, the Netherlands, Slovenia, Romania, Poland and the Czech Republic.

References

|-

1954 births
20th-century American lawyers
21st-century American politicians
Candidates in the 2004 United States elections
Candidates in the 2014 United States elections
Environmental scientists
Living people
Democratic Party members of the New Mexico House of Representatives
New Mexico Attorneys General
New Mexico lawyers
New Mexico State University alumni
People from Stanley, New Mexico
People from Moriarty, New Mexico
University of Colorado Boulder alumni
University of New Mexico School of Law alumni